The Sévère-René River is a tributary on the west bank of the Nicolet Southwest River. It crosses the municipalities of Saint-Zéphirin-de-Courval and La Visitation-de-Yamaska, in the Nicolet-Yamaska Regional County Municipality (MRC), in the administrative region from Centre-du-Québec, to Quebec, to Canada.

Geography 

The main neighboring hydrographic slopes of the Sévère-René river are:
 North side: South-West Nicolet River, Nicolet River, Lake Saint-Pierre, St. Lawrence River;
 East side: Nicolet Southwest River, Grady stream;
 South side: Saint-Zéphirin River, Saint-François River;
 West side: Tête de Rivière stream, Saint-Zéphirin River.

The Sévère-René river takes its sources from agricultural streams, located in an area northwest of rang Saint-Alexandre road and northeast of rang Saint-François road, in the municipality of Saint-Zéphirin-de-Courval. Its source begins at the confluence of the Rousseau-Leclerc and Dionne-Leclerc rivers.

From its head area, the Sévère-René river flows north for four km, first in Saint-Zéphirin-de-Courval, then in La Visitation-de-Yamaska. Along its course, it collects water from the Houle-Lemaire landfill and crosses the road to rang Sainte-Geneviève and the road to rang Chatillon.

Toponymy 
The toponym "Rivière Sévère-René" was made official on December 5, 1968, at the Commission de toponymie du Québec.

See also 
 List of rivers of Quebec

References 

Rivers of Centre-du-Québec
Nicolet-Yamaska Regional County Municipality